Feminism & Psychology is a quarterly peer-reviewed academic journal that covers feminist theory and practice in psychology. It was established in 1991 and is published by SAGE Publications.

Abstracting and indexing 
The journal is abstracted and indexed in Scopus and the Social Sciences Citation Index. According to the Journal Citation Reports, the journal has a 2015 impact factor of 3.377, ranking it 53rd out of 129 journals in the category "Psychology, Multidisciplinary" and 11th out of 40 journals in the category "Women's Studies". The journal has a 2022 impact factor of 3.377.

Editors
Catriona Ida Macleod (2013–present)

See also 
 List of women's studies journals

References

External links
 

Gender studies journals
Publications established in 1991
Quarterly journals
Women's health
Women's studies journals
English-language journals
SAGE Publishing academic journals
Women and psychology